Jana Bach (born 10 April 1979) is a German pornographic actress, model, and television host.

Adult career
Jana Bach began modeling for the erotic magazine Coupé in 2004, and entered the adult film industry at the German Venus Festival. She has appeared in more than thirty adult films since 2005 (see below), primarily for the Berlin-based Inflagranti-Film label.

Bach participated in a topless women's football match between Austria and Germany as goalkeeper for the Germans. She was quoted, "I was supposed to hold the balls but I really have no idea how to do that".

Awards
2005 Eroticline Award - Best German Newcomer
2006 Eroticline Award - Best Actress (Germany)
2007 Eroticline Award - Best Sex-TV Host
2008 Eroticline Award - Best Crossover Star (Germany)
2009 Eroticline Award - Pornstar of the Year

Partial filmography
2005:
Sex & Lügen
Jana von 0 auf 100
Rocker Queens
Popp oder Hopp - Das Live-Sex-Spiel No. 10
Fetish-Zone: Fußorgasmen
Schwarze Flamme Silverline: Landzucht
Stahlhart: Gefangene der Lust
2006:
Janas Sex-Fantasien
Die Jana Bach Show
Jana Bach: Schlaflos in Berlin
Best of Jana Bach
Zicken... jetzt seid ihr fällig! Folge 5
2007:
Jana Bach, Der Star hautnah
Jana Bach, Living Hardcore
Stars & Strips & Sexintrigen
2008:
SexParadies
Love & Sex - The Parade 2008

References

External links
 
 

1979 births
German pornographic film actresses
German television personalities
Living people
People from Eisleben